The Seminole, also known as the Seminole Limited, was a passenger train operated by the Illinois Central Railroad, Central of Georgia Railway, and Atlantic Coast Line Railroad between Chicago, Illinois and Jacksonville, Florida. It operated from 1909 to 1969 and was the first year-round service between the two cities.

History 
The Illinois Central Railroad, Central of Georgia Railway, and Atlantic Coast Line Railroad introduced the Seminole Limited on November 15, 1909, in time for the winter tourist season. The new train carried coaches, sleeping cars, and a full dining car. Through services included a St. Louis, Missouri–Jacksonville sleeper and a Chicago–Savannah, Georgia sleeper. The train operated on a "two night out" schedule, departing Chicago at 9:00 PM and arriving in Jacksonville at 7:05 AM on the second morning out. This permitted a late afternoon arrival in Birmingham, Alabama. The travel time was 35 hours from Chicago, three hours faster than existing services. The train operated on a daily schedule. The Illinois Central billed it as a "solid, fast through train." From Jacksonville passengers could make connections to other locations in Florida. It was the first year-round service between the two cities.

The African-American dramatist and playwright T. Montgomery Gregory, then a professor at Howard University, rode the Seminole Limited in Georgia in 1915 as part of his investigation into "Jim Crow" (segregated) cars on Southern trains. Gregory noted that even though the segregated cars on the Central of Georgia were "superior" to other railroads and that the Seminole Limited in particular was "one of the most favorable trains in the South", the train's conductor forced him from his coach at three in the morning to make room for whites who wanted to smoke. He was placed in an ostensibly white car which he characterized as "filthy" and the "nastiest...[he] had ever ridden in."

In 1950 the Illinois Central rescheduled the Seminole to depart Chicago at 4:00 PM. This put the southbound train in Birmingham at 8:30 AM and Jacksonville at 9:00 PM.

On July 1, 1967, the ACL became part of a merger product, the Seaboard Coast Line Railroad; and, thus, the SCL was a partner for the train in its final two years.

On June 3, 1969, the Illinois Central truncated the Seminole from Jacksonville to Carbondale and renamed it the Shawnee. The Shawnee would be one of the few Illinois Central trains retained by Amtrak in 1971.

Equipment
In 1952 a typical Seminole carried sleeping cars for five city pairs: Chicago–St. Petersburg, Chicago–Tampa/Sarasota, Chicago–Birmingham, St. Louis–Tampa/Sarasota, and St. Louis–St. Petersburg. With the exception of the Birmingham sleeper these were scheduled for alternate days, so that there was always one sleeper each for Chicago and St. Louis on the one hand, and St. Petersburg and Tampa/Sarasota on the other. Connecting Atlantic Coast Line trains handled the sleepers south of Jacksonville; the Illinois Central's Chickasaw handled the St. Louis sleepers west of Carbondale, Illinois. The sleeping cars each had eight sections, two compartments, and a drawing room. A dining car operated Chicago–Jacksonville and a buffet-lounge Carbondale–St. Louis. For the final Albany, Georgia to Jacksonville leg of the trip, the train ran in tandem, with the matching departure times for the itinerary of the Louisville & Nashville's Flamingo.

Coach passengers would need to transfer at Jacksonville Union Station to respective connecting Atlantic Coast Line and Florida East Coast Railway coach cars. Illinois Central, Atlantic Coast Line and Florida East Coast Railway timetables indicate that the matching FEC train in Jacksonville for the trips south and north was the FEC's Havana Special.

Cultural influence
The Seminole was a likely influence on blues guitarist Tampa Red's song "Seminole Blues":

Notes

References 
 
 

Named passenger trains of the United States
Night trains of the United States
Passenger trains of the Atlantic Coast Line Railroad
Passenger trains of the Central of Georgia Railway
Passenger trains of the Illinois Central Railroad
Passenger trains of the Seaboard Coast Line Railroad
Passenger rail transportation in Illinois
Passenger rail transportation in Kentucky
Passenger rail transportation in Tennessee
Passenger rail transportation in Mississippi
Passenger rail transportation in Alabama
Passenger rail transportation in Georgia (U.S. state)
Passenger rail transportation in Florida
Railway services introduced in 1909
Railway services discontinued in 1969